And the Crowd Goes Wild is the fifth studio album, and sixth album overall, by American country music artist Mark Wills. Released in 2003 as his last album for Mercury Nashville Records, the album produced two top 40 hit singles on the Billboard Hot Country Singles & Tracks (now Hot Country Songs) charts: the title track and "That's a Woman", which peaked at #29 and #40, respectively. The album itself peaked at #5 on the Billboard Top Country Albums charts, and #68 on The Billboard 200.

Content
The title track was previously recorded by Jeffrey Steele on his 2002 album Somethin' in the Water, and later covered by PBR Allstars on their album Buck and Roll: Vol. 1. "Prisoner of the Highway" is a cover version of a song previously recorded by Ronnie Milsap, and features guest vocals from him. "What Hurts the Most" was later recorded by pop singer Jo O'Meara and country trio Rascal Flatts, who released their versions in 2005 and 2006, respectively. Wills's version, though never released as a single itself, peaked at #51 on the Billboard Hot Digital Songs charts in 2006. Additionally, "A Singer in a Band" was later recorded by Joe Nichols on his 2004 album Revelation.

Track listing
'

Personnel
Tim Akers – keyboards
Kelly Archer – background vocals
Tommy Bass – background vocals
Tom Bukovac – electric guitar, acoustic guitar
J. T. Corenflos – electric guitar
Eric Darken – percussion
Paul Franklin – steel guitar
Aubrey Haynie – fiddle, mandolin
Jeff Hazard – background vocals
Wes Hightower – background vocals
Bruce Johnson – background vocals
Vanessa Lynch – background vocals
Aimee Mayo – background vocals
Cory Mayo – background vocals
Ronnie Milsap – duet vocals on "Prisoner of the Highway"
George Plaster – spoken commentary on "And the Crowd Goes Wild"
John Wesley Ryles – background vocals
Jimmie Lee Sloas – bass guitar
Biff Watson – acoustic guitar
Bruce Willingham – background vocals
Mark Wills – lead vocals
Lonnie Wilson – drums

Strings on "That's a Woman" and "What Hurts the Most" performed by the Nashville String Machine and conducted by Carl Gorodetzky.

Chart performance

References

External links

2003 albums
Mercury Nashville albums
Mark Wills albums
Albums produced by Chris Lindsey